The 1950–51 season was Real Madrid Club de Fútbol's 48th season in existence and the club's 19th consecutive season in the top flight of Spanish football.

Summary
During the summer Santiago Bernabéu signed two French footballers, Jean Luciano and Louis Hon, from OGC Nice. Michael Keeping was sacked on 23 October by Bernabéu after three massive losses against Real Sociedad, FC Barcelona and Deportivo La Coruña. The club appointed Baltasar Albeniz who could not improve the situation and was sacked on 5 March after a 0–4 defeat to Sevilla. Then, Bernabeu brought Uruguayan head coach Hector Scarone who managed the team to ninth, avoiding relegation to the Second Division.

Real reached the 1951 Copa del Generalísimo semi-finals and were defeated by Real Sociedad 0–3 on aggregate.

Squad

Transfers

Competitions

La Liga

League table

Position by round

Matches

Copa del Generalísimo

First round

Quarter-finals

Semi-finals

Statistics

Players statistics

References

Real Madrid CF seasons
Real Madrid CF